Ortegia is a monotypic genus of flowering plants belonging to the family Caryophyllaceae. It only contains one known species, Ortegia hispanica L. It is part of the tribe Polycarpaeae, clustering with Cardionema and Illecebrum.

Its native range is the western Mediterranean. It is still found in Portugal and Spain.
It is now classed as extinct in Algeria and Italy.

The genus name of Ortegia is in honour of José Ortega (d. 1761), a Spanish military apothecary at the court of Ferdinand VI. He was also the secretary of the royal academy of medicine and director of a medicinal botanical garden in Madrid. 
The genus of Ortegia has 3 known synonyms; Cervaria , Mosina  and Terogia 

The Latin specific epithet of hispanica is derived from Hispanic (Spanish: Hispano) which refers to people, cultures, or countries related to Spain. Both the genus and the species were first described and published in C.Linnaeus's book, Sp. Pl. on page 560 in 1753.

References

Caryophyllaceae
Caryophyllaceae genera
Plants described in 1753
Flora of Portugal
Flora of Spain
Ortegia hispanica